Fashion Week Mexico City is a semi-annual fashion week event held in Mexico City, Mexico. The Autumn/Winter fashion week takes place during the late first quarter or the year, and the Spring/Summer fashion week is held during the early fourth quarter or the year.

References

External links
 Official website 

Fashion weeks